John Holland Chapman was the ninth Canadian Anglican Bishop of Ottawa.

A native of Ottawa, Chapman was  educated at  Carleton University, the University of Western Ontario, and the University of the South and ordained Deacon and Priest in 1978. His first post was as assistant curate at St. Matthias' Church, Ottawa after which he became Anglican Chaplain at the University of Western Ontario. In 1983 he joined the Faculty of Theology at Huron University College, University of Western Ontario. In 1987 he became Rector of St. Jude, London, Ontario; and in 1999 Professor  of Pastoral Theology at Huron University College and appointed Dean of Theology in 2000, a position he held until his election to the Ottawa See in  September 2007.

References 

 

Carleton University alumni
Anglican bishops of Ottawa
21st-century Anglican Church of Canada bishops
Living people
Year of birth missing (living people)